Kuo Chuan Presbyterian Secondary School (KCPSS) is a co-educational government-aided secondary school located in Bishan, Singapore.

History

In 1924, two Christian ministers, reverends Tay Sek Tin and Tan Leng Tian, founded Katong Girls' School at 1 Joo Chiat Terrace. It had a modest enrolment of 11 pupils, both boys and girls. English and Chinese classes were conducted.

By 1925, the school moved to new premises at Koon Seng Road and was named Choon Guan School. In 1934, Margaret Dryburgh was appointed principal. Educational standards were raised and in 1936 the English section became a separate school called Choon Guan English School. In 1938, it became a 'grant-in-aid' for boys and J R Richardson became the principal.  The same year Kuo Chuan Girls' School was opened at 36 Joo Chiat Lane with Margaret Dryburgh as principal. It had one hundred girls and three teachers. During the Japanese occupation, the school was bombed and remained closed for the duration of the war while the boys' school became a Japanese school named Koon Seng Road School.  The boys' school was reopened on 24th September 1945. To accommodate those who could not gain admission, Dryburgh English School was established as an afternoon school. The girls' school did not open until the next year, with Monica Sirkett as principal.

The boys' school was renamed Presbyterian Boys' School in 1946.  B F Atherton became principal in 1951, followed by Gay Wan Guay in 1958.  Dryburgh English School was merged with Presbyterian Boys' School under principal Sia Kah Hui in 1961.

The two schools were merged into Kuo Chuan Presbyterian School in 1985, and was split into primary and secondary school buildings as of 1987.

The school’s football field started undergoing renovation in 2022.

Co-curricular activities
The school offers 21 extra-curricular activities, labelled as co-curricular activities (CCAs) by the Ministry of Education. These include sports, uniformed groups, performing arts, clubs and societies. Several of these have performed well in outside competitions.

The school's uniformed groups have been able to achieve much over the past few years, with its National Police Cadet Corps (NPCC) unit attained Gold for the Unit Overall Proficiency Award in 2017 and 2016, and Silver in 2015 and 2014. Its Girl Guides (1st Coy) (GG) unit also attained Gold for the Puan Noor Aisah Award in 2017, 2016 and 2015.

KCPSS's soccer team (B division) has gotten third place in the second-tier league, in 2017.

References

External links
 School Website

Schools in Bishan, Singapore
Secondary schools in Singapore
Presbyterian schools in Singapore
Educational institutions established in 1924
Schools in Central Region, Singapore
1924 establishments in British Malaya